The 2013 British Academy Scotland New Talent Awards were held on 21 March 2013 at the Oran Mor in Glasgow.  Presented by BAFTA Scotland, the accolades honour the best upcoming talent in the field of film and television in Scotland. The Nominees were announced on 7 March 2013. The ceremony was hosted by Muriel Gray.

Winners and nominees

Winners are listed first and highlighted in boldface.

Special Award for New Work
Hannah and the Moon

See also
2013 British Academy Scotland Awards

References

External links
BAFTA Scotland Home page

New Talent
2013 film awards
2013 in Scotland
2010s in Glasgow
2013 in British cinema
2013 in British television
2013 television awards
2013 awards in the United Kingdom
March 2013 events in the United Kingdom